Sophie Simard (born September 20, 1978) is an international freestyle and butterfly swimmer who competed for Canada at the 1996 Summer Olympics in Atlanta, Georgia.  There she swam in the preliminary heats of the 4x200-metre freestyle relay, alongside Joanne Malar, Marianne Limpert, and Jessica Deglau.  In the final she and Malar were replaced by Shannon Shakespeare and Andrea Schwartz.  The resident of Sainte-Foy, Quebec was also a member of the Canadian national swimming team at the 2006 Commonwealth Games in Melbourne, Australia.

References
 Sophie Simard Bio, Stats, and Results | Olympics at Sports-Reference.com

1978 births
Living people
Canadian female butterfly swimmers
Canadian female freestyle swimmers
Olympic swimmers of Canada
People from Sainte-Foy, Quebec City
Swimmers from Quebec City
Swimmers at the 1996 Summer Olympics
Swimmers at the 2006 Commonwealth Games
Commonwealth Games medallists in swimming
Laval Rouge et Or athletes
Commonwealth Games bronze medallists for Canada
20th-century Canadian women
Medallists at the 2006 Commonwealth Games